Harry Tietlebaum or Teitelbaum (born 1889) was an American organized crime figure in New York's underworld during Prohibition as he was associated of the Bug and Meyer Mob. He was later part of a major heroin smuggling operation with Meyer Lansky and Harry "Nig" Rosen during the early 1930s.

Further reading
Eisenberg, Dennis, Dan Uri & Eli Landau. Meyer Lansky: Mogul of the Mob. New York: Paddington Press, 1979. 
Fried, Albert. The Rise and Fall of the Jewish Gangster in America. New York: Holt, Rinehart and Winston, 1980. 
Messick, Hank. Lansky. London: Robert Hale & Company, 1973. 
Newark, Tim. Mafia Allies: The True Story of America's Secret Alliance with the Mob in World War II. St. Paul, Minnesota: MBI Publishing Company, 2007. 

1889 births
Year of death missing
Jewish American gangsters
Criminals from New York City